The Ross Local School District is a public school district in Butler County, southwestern Ohio, United States, based in Hamilton, Ohio.

Schools
The Ross Local School District has two elementary schools, one middle school, and one high school.

Elementary schools
Elda Elementary School
Morgan Elementary School

Intermediate Schools 
Ross Intermediate School

Middle school
Ross Middle School

High school
Ross High School

References

External links

School districts in Ohio
Education in Butler County, Ohio
Hamilton, Ohio